Ramesh Kadam was a leader of the Nationalist Congress Party and a member of the Maharashtra Legislative Assembly. In August 2015, he was arrested for alleged  fraud and embezzlement of funds from a state-run corporation.

He is now incarcerated in the state-of-the-art cell at Arthur Road Jail which was previously constructed for Ajmal Kasab. The cell is reportedly air conditioned.

References

Nationalist Congress Party politicians from Maharashtra
Maharashtra MLAs 2014–2019
People from Solapur district
Living people
Year of birth missing (living people)